Donald McGray "Don" Phillips (August 24, 1929 – October 5, 2016) was a Canadian politician. He served in the Legislative Assembly of British Columbia from 1966 to 1969 and from 1972 to 1986, as a Social Credit member for the constituency of South Peace River.

He died on October 5, 2016 at the age of 87. He lived in Australia in his later years, where he died.

References

1929 births
2016 deaths
British Columbia Social Credit Party MLAs
Canadian expatriates in Australia
Canadian lobbyists
Members of the Executive Council of British Columbia
People from Woodstock, New Brunswick
20th-century Canadian politicians